Helen Tracy Lowe-Porter (June 15, 1876 – April 26, 1963) was an American translator and writer, best known for translating almost all of the works of Thomas Mann for their first publication in English.

Personal life
Helen Tracy Porter was the daughter of Clara (née Holcombe) and Henry Clinton Porter. She was the niece of Charlotte Endymion Porter, editor of Poet Lore, a poetry journal, and an expert on Shakespeare and Elizabeth and Robert Browning. She married the paleographer Elias Avery Lowe in 1911. The couple lived in Oxford; after 1937, their residence was in Princeton, New Jersey. Their great-grandson is Boris Johnson, the former Prime Minister of the United Kingdom.

Career
For more than two decades, Lowe-Porter had exclusive rights to translate the works of Thomas Mann from German into English. She was granted these rights in 1925 by Alfred A. Knopf.

In her essay "On Translating Thomas Mann," Lowe-Porter discussed translating Mann's novels, and expressed some thoughts on translating generally. She wrote, for example, that in translating the second volume of Mann's Joseph series, Young Joseph, she had ″been forced—since the English version was for both markets [British and American]—to emasculate the style, in some degree, taking care to write only what would be acceptable literary usage on both sides of the ocean.″ She also said, in her note to her translation of Der Zauberberg (The Magic Mountain):
[T]he violet has to be cast into the crucible, the organic work of art to be remoulded in another tongue.... [S]ince in the creative act word and thought are indivisible, the task was seen to be one before which artists shrink and logical minds recoil.
She wrote an original play, Abdication, which received its first production in Dublin in September 1948.

Thomas Mann translations
Lowe-Porter's translations of Thomas Mann works include the following (dates in brackets refer to the German publication, the dates after to the English-language translations).
 Buddenbrooks [1901] 1924
 The Magic Mountain [1924] 1927
 Death in Venice [1913] 1928
 Mario and the Magician [1930] 1931
 Joseph and His Brothers, comprising:
I    The Tales of Jacob [1933] 1934
II   Young Joseph [1934] 1935
III  Joseph in Egypt [1936] 1938
IV   Joseph the Provider [1943] 1944
 Stories of Three Decades 1936
 The Beloved Returns [1939] 1940
 The Transposed Heads [1940] 1941
 Essays of Three Decades 1947
 Doctor Faustus [1947] 1948
 The Holy Sinner [1951] 1951
 A Sketch of My Life 1960

Critical reaction
For decades, Lowe-Porter's translations of Mann were the only versions that existed in the English-speaking world, aside from Herman George Scheffauer's. Mann expressed his appreciation to Lowe-Porter for her work, nicknaming her "die Lowe", but also added the caveat, "insofar as my linguistic knowledge suffices". Critic Theodore Ziolkowski said of Lowe-Porter's translation of Mann's Buddenbrooks:

Lowe-Porter provided a valuable service by making Mann's novel initially accessible to the English and American publics.

Other commentaries on her translations have included the following:
The Lowe-Porter translations of Thomas Mann, despite occasional inaccuracies almost inevitable in works of such length and complexity, convey the ironic and pyrotechnical style of the original with great effectiveness.

Despite minor inaccuracies, misreadings, and possible errors of judgment (to which all translators are subject, whatever they may say), Lowe-Porter's translations are widely beloved and have become classics in their own right, to stand beside Constance Garnett's Tolstoy and Dostoyevsky and Scott Moncrieff's Proust. She is indisputably, in quantity as in quality, one of the great translators of our time.

Thomas Mann and Proust were lucky in their translators.Though early reviewers were generally impressed by the relative readability of Lowe-Porter's English and by the sheer scale of the task, from the 1950s on doubts were expressed about the accuracy of the translations, culminating in Timothy Buck's study which led him to conclude that they constituted "grossly distorted and diminished versions" of Mann's work, and that "the loss, not only of accuracy but also of quality, is inestimable." Not only was her grasp of German so shaky that she made countless elementary errors of comprehension, but she also made frequent omissions and additions and unnecessarily simplified Mann's characteristic complex syntax. A review of John E. Woods' translation of Mann's Buddenbrooks states that, in her translation of the novel, Lowe-Porter "leveled Mann's colorful variety of speech into a uniformly even style, in certain cases simply omitting passages. As a result, much of the novel's humor was lost."

A new assessment of the English translations of Thomas Mann within the framework of modern descriptive-analytical translation studies has been provided by David Horton. Horton seeks to move beyond an exclusively error-based evaluation of literary translation, examines various salient dimensions of versions by Lowe-Porter, David Luke, and John E. Woods, and demonstrates that Lowe-Porter's approach to translation was in keeping with the practice prevalent at the time. A review of Horton's book concludes, "Not the least of Horton's accomplishments is to rehabilitate [Lowe-Porter's] reputation...."

References

External links
 

1876 births
1963 deaths
German–English translators
American translators
People from Princeton, New Jersey
American women dramatists and playwrights
Translators of Thomas Mann
Writers from New Jersey
People from Towanda, Pennsylvania
Writers from Pennsylvania
20th-century translators
20th-century American women writers
Literary translators
Boris Johnson family